John Pollard Seddon FRIBA (19 September 1827 – 1 February 1906) was a British architect, working largely on churches.

His father was a cabinetmaker, and his brother Thomas Seddon (1821–1856) a landscape painter.  Born in London, he was educated at Bedford School. He was later a pupil of Thomas Leverton Donaldson, though Donaldson was a classical architect and Seddon preferred the Gothic Revivalism of John Ruskin.

Between 1852 and 1863, Seddon formed a partnership with John Prichard. Many of their major commissions were church restoration works, most famously for Llandaff Cathedral. In 1871 he submitted a design in a competition for Holloway Sanatorium.

C. F. A. Voysey was articled as a pupil of Seddon in 1873. From 1884 to 1904 he was in partnership with John Coates Carter.

In 1904 he was Diocesan Architect for London and designed a gigantic Imperial Monumental Halls, with a tall tower, to be added to Westminster Abbey; it was intended to restore the dominance of the abbey over the surrounding crowd of towers and monuments. However, the cost of construction was prohibitive and it remained unbuilt. 
 
His works include the University College of Wales building in Aberystwyth; St Peter's Church, Ayot St Peter, Hertfordshire; St Nicholas Church, Great Yarmouth; St Catherine's Church, Hoarwithy, Herefordshire; and, with Prichard, the Church of St John, Llandenny; the 1858–9 rebuild of St Mary's Church, Aberavon, and limited extensions to Dingestow Court, Monmouthshire, including the stables.  He was also a prolific designer of  furniture, metalwork, stained glass, tiles and ceramics.

References

1827 births
1906 deaths
People educated at Bedford School
19th-century English architects
Fellows of the Royal Institute of British Architects